Chiranjeevulu is the title of two Telugu-language films:

 Chiranjeevulu (1956 film)
 Chiranjeevulu (2001 film)